Mita Medici (born 20 August 1950) is an Italian actress and singer. She was sometimes credited as Patrizia Perini.

Biography 
Born in Rome as Patrizia Vistarini, daughter of the actor Franco Silva, she was launched in 1965 by winning the "Miss Teenager" pageant. Medici made her film debut in 1966, at 16, in Luciano Salce's How I Learned to Love Women. She is also active in television, in which she hosted shows such as Canzonissima and Sereno variabile and appeared in several TV-series.  She was also a singer, active between late 60's and early 80's, and her main success was the song "A ruota libera", which in 1973 ranked 10 in the Italian Hit Parade.

In 1968, she was the subject of the song "Mita, Mita, Mita" by progressive rock group Le Orme.

Discography

Studio albums
…A ruota libera (1973)
Per una volta (1975)

Singles
"Questo amore finito così" (1969)
"Un posto per me/Avventura che nasce" (1970)
"Un amore/Una storia come tante" (1971)
"Quei giorni/Se ci sta lui" (1972)
"Ruota libera/Cosa vuoi che ti dica" (1973)
"Proprio così/Tremendo" (1973)
"Scappa scappa/Quei giorni" (1973)
"Chi sono/Nave" (1975)
"Uomo/Trucco" (1977)
"Paletta paletta/Mago tango" (1981)
"Ma che fiesta" feat. Gianni Dei (1989)

References

External links 

 
 Mita Medici at Discogs

Living people
Italian television actresses
1950 births
Italian women singers
Actresses from Rome
Italian film actresses
Italian stage actresses